Suwałki Voivodeship was an administrative division and local government in Poland from 1975 to 1998. In 1999 the Voidvodeship was divided in half and reassigned to two other Voivodeships – the eastern half to Podlaskie Voivodeship and the western half to Warmian-Masurian Voivodeship.

Its capital city was Suwałki.

Cities and towns
Major cities and towns (population in 1998):
Suwałki – 68,331 (1995 – 66,200)
Ełk – 56,208 (1995 – 55,100)
Giżycko – 31,484 (1995 – 30,600)
Augustów – 30,162 (1995 – 29,600)
Pisz – 19,571
Olecko – 17,175
Gołdap – 13,858
Węgorzewo – 12,331

Population
1975 – 414,700
1980 – 422,600
1985 – 449,000
1990 – 470,600
1995 – 485,600
1998 – 489,200

References

Former voivodeships of Poland (1975–1998)